Varkaus (before year 1929 Warkaus) is a Middle-Savonian industrial town and municipality of Finland. It is located in the province of Eastern Finland and is part of the Northern Savonia region, between city of Kuopio and town of Savonlinna.

The municipality is unilingually Finnish. In old Finnish 'Varkaus' meant strait, and this city is located in the lake district on straits between two parts of Lake Saimaa. An extension of the Saimaa Canal passes through the town.

History 
Varkaus was born in the late 19th century as an industrial community of the A. Ahlström paper mills. It was a part of the municipalities of Leppävirta and Joroinen until 1929 when Varkaus became a market town. During the Finnish Civil War in 1918 the town was taken over by the Reds, but because of its isolated location in rural Finland, it was soon taken by the Whites on the Battle of Varkaus 19–21 February. The whites proceeded to execute every tenth Red soldier.

The municipality of Kangaslampi was consolidated to Varkaus on 1 January 2005.

Sport 
The bandy team Warkauden Pallo-35, or just WP-35, plays in the highest division, Bandyliiga, and has become Finnish champions 16 times.

Notable people 
 Onni Hiltunen (1895–1971), politician
 Jukka Keskisalo (born 1981), steeplechaser
 Antti Kupiainen (born 1954), mathematical physicist
 Esa Pakarinen (1911–1989), actor and musician
 Esa Pakarinen Junior (born 1947), actor
 Piia Pantsu (born 1971), equestrian rider
 Lassi Parkkinen (1917–1994), speed skater
 Erkki Pulliainen (born 1938), biologist and politician
 Pekka Siitoin (1944–2003), occultist and neo-Nazi
 Petri Varis (born 1969), ice hockey forward

Parts of the town of Varkaus
Kaura-aho
Käpykangas
Kuoppakangas
Kosulanniemi
Lehtoniemi
Puurtila
Taipale
Luttila
Könönpelto
Kangaslampi
Kurola
Hasinmäki
Häyrilä
Päiviönsaari
Peltola

Twin towns — sister cities
Varkaus is twinned with:

See also
 Soisalo

References

External links
 
 
 Town of Varkaus – Official website

 
Cities and towns in Finland
Populated places established in 1929